Oleksandr Mitko is a retired Ukrainian football player.

Career
Volodymyr Kolomiets started his career in 1994 with Desna Chernihiv, the main club in the city of Chernihiv.In the season 1996–97 with the club he won the Ukrainian Second League. In 2001 he played 2 matches with Yevropa Pryluky and 3 with FC Nizhyn. In 2002 he moved to Fakel Varva where he won the Chernihiv Oblast Football Championship. In 2004 he moved to Kommunalnik Zhlobin from Zhlobin, playing in the Belarusian Second League.

Honours
Fakel Varva
 Chernihiv Oblast Football Championship 2002 

Desna Chernihiv
 Ukrainian Second League: 1996–97

References

External links 
 Oleksandr Mitko at footballfacts.ru

1974 births
Living people
Footballers from Chernihiv
FC Desna Chernihiv players
FC Nyva Vinnytsia players
FC Fakel Varva players
FC Zhlobin players
Ukrainian footballers
Ukrainian Second League players
Ukrainian expatriate footballers
Ukrainian expatriate sportspeople in Belarus
Expatriate footballers in Belarus
Association football goalkeepers